Michael Guest could refer to: 

Michael E. Guest (born 1957), American diplomat
Michael Guest (politician) (born 1970), American attorney and politician